The Country Party of New Zealand was a political party which appealed to rural voters. It was represented in Parliament from 1928 to 1938. Its policies were a mixture of rural advocacy and social credit theory.

History
The Country Party had its origins in the Auckland Farmers' Union, a branch of the New Zealand Farmers' Union which covered most of the upper North Island. In the 1920s, members of this branch increasingly came to believe that the Reform Party, which traditionally enjoyed much support in rural areas, was now putting the interests of farmers behind those of businesses in the city. The Auckland branch was also strongly influenced by the social credit theory of monetary reform, promoted by C. H. Douglas.  Many farmers believed that the country's financial system did not treat them fairly, and that they were being exploited by big-city bankers and moneylenders.

The Auckland branch grew increasingly frustrated with the Farmers' Union leadership, which did not support having an independent rural party. Eventually members of the Auckland branch established the Country Party without the Union's backing. In 1928, the branch broke away from the Union altogether, giving its full backing to the Country Party. Because of this geographical basis, the Country Party was largely confined to the upper North Island.

In the 1925 elections, the Country Party fielded five candidates, but only won 0.3% of the vote. In the 1928 elections, however, the party won 1.6% of the vote, and Harold Rushworth, its candidate in the Bay of Islands seat, was narrowly elected. In Parliament, the Country Party tended to align itself with the growing Labour Party, primarily because both parties were distrustful of the financial and banking industries.

In the 1931 elections, the Country Party increased its share of the vote to 2.3%, and Rushworth kept his seat. In the 1935 elections, the party's share of the vote dropped slightly, but it won two seats – Rushworth, aided by the Labour Party's decision not to stand a candidate against him, was re-elected, while Arthur Sexton was elected in the Franklin electorate.

In the 1938 elections, the Country Party lost both its seats as Labour decided to contest them. Rushworth had retired (partly because of Labour's intervention) and Sexton was defeated by the National Party. The party won only 0.23% of the vote, and disappeared soon afterwards. Most rural voters who had supported it turned to the National Party, which incorporated the Reform Party. Later, however, the Social Credit Party would gain a certain amount of success in rural areas using much the same formula – some see the Country Party as a forerunner to the more long-lived Social Credit.

Country Party, 1969  
The party put forward candidates in 15 seats, and they attracted 6,715 votes. Emeny stood in Stratford where he got 1130 votes, the largest vote for the party; and in Egmont, New Plymouth, Tauranga and Waimarino. The other seats contested were Ashburton, Hamilton West, Otago, Pahiatua, Raglan, Rangitikei, Rodney, Waikato, Waitomo and Wallace.

The Country Party had changed its name to the Liberal Reform Party in 1970.

Electoral results

Electorate results

1925 general election

1928 general election

1931 general election

1935 general election

1938 general election

By-elections

References

External links

Defunct agrarian political parties
Defunct political parties in New Zealand
Political parties established in 1924
1924 establishments in New Zealand
Social credit parties
Political parties disestablished in 1938
1938 disestablishments in New Zealand
Agrarian parties in New Zealand